Cangnan railway station is a railway station located in Cangnan County, Wenzhou, Zhejiang Province, China, on the Wenzhou–Fuzhou railway which operated by Shanghai Railway Bureau, China Railway Corporation. There is a freight handling facility nearby.

History
The station opened on 28 September 2009. In 2020, it underwent a renovation.

References

Railway stations in Zhejiang
Railway stations in China opened in 2009